John Johnston (1775–1861) was an Indian agent in the United States Northwest Territory.  He was born on 25 March 1775 near Ballyshannon in the north of Ireland.  His father was Scottish and his mother was a Huguenot. He left Ireland when he was eleven years old, travelling to America with a priest and a trusted family friend who was also his tutor. When he emigrated to Pennsylvania in 1786, his father, mother, four brothers, and one sister remained in Ireland. They came to America five years after he settled here.

Johnston's career with Native Americans started as a wagoner for General Anthony Wayne's Legion of the United States. He returned to Pennsylvania after the campaign and worked as a law clerk.  At age 27, Johnston met Rachel Robinson, who was 16.  They eloped to Lancaster, Ohio and were married on 15 July 1802.  They had 15 children - the first 4 were the first all-white children to be born at Ft. Wayne (now Fort Wayne, Indiana). 14 of their 15 children lived into adulthood.

In 1802, President Thomas Jefferson appointed Johnston as Indian Agent at the new trading agency in Fort Wayne, and by 1809 he was in charge of two Indian Agencies. His primary responsibility was to manage trade so that Indians in the area would not seek trade with the nearby British.  Johnston was responsible to the territorial governor, William Henry Harrison, and to the Superintendent of Indian Trade.  Almost immediately, however, a rivalry began between Johnston and William Wells, the official interpreter at Fort Wayne.  The Miami of Fort Wayne trusted Wells, who had been adopted into their tribe, while U.S. government officials questioned Wells' loyalty and sided with Johnston. Johnston remained at Fort Wayne through a period of growing resentment between the American Indians and the United States, and filed a report summarizing Indian accounts of the Battle of Tippecanoe in 1811.

That same year, an Indian agency was established at Piqua, Ohio, and Johnston asked to be transferred to the new agency.  He was at this agency during the War of 1812, and organized a Shawnee party under Captain Logan to rescue women and children during the Siege of Fort Wayne, where his brother, Stephen, was killed. He had much better relations with the local Shawnee and Wyandot than he had with the Indians at Fort Wayne, and served as Indian Agent until 1829.  He helped negotiate the Treaty of Upper Sandusky in 1842, which removed the Wyandot from Ohio to the West.
It was reported that he earned a $1200.00 salary per year as an agent, and he retained that position until let go by President Jackson - a total of thirty-one years.

Johnston was a Whig, and in 1844 was one of Ohio's delegates to the Whig Party's national convention.  After the convention, he travelled to campaign for Henry Clay.

Besides his duties as an Indian agent, he also contributed to many other facets of Ohio.  He was a canal commissioner with Ohio for eleven years, president of the historical and philosophical societies in Ohio, and founder of the first Sunday school in Miami County, Ohio. John Johnston was also founder of Kenyon College, served on the board of trustees of Miami University, and was a member of the board at West Point. He wrote Indian Tribes in Ohio before he died in 1861 in Washington, D.C. Today, his Piqua farm maintained by the Ohio Historical Society.

John and Rachel Johnston were married for 38 years before his wife died on 24 July 1840, after eleven days of illness. The bereavement after the death of his wife in the family home, caused him to leave and move to Cincinnati with a daughter, and then later to Dayton, where he died in 1861 at the age of 86.

Notes

References
 
 Hill, Leonard. Col. John Johnson and the Indians in the Land of the Three Miamis. Columbus, Ohio: Stoneman Press, 1957.
 History of Miami County Ohio - Col. John Johnston. Piqua Public Library (3 files).
 Horsman, Reginald. "John Johnston: Indian Agent and Ohio Citizen." Timeline, Ohio Historical Society, July–September 2013. Volume 30, Number 3.

External links
Fort Wayne Indian Agency Collection at the William L. Clements Library
Johnston Farm Ohio

Piqua Historical Area - Johnston farm
Shelby County, Ohio History

John Johnston at Find a grave

1775 births
Irish emigrants to the United States (before 1923)
Northwest Territory officials
Ohio Whigs
19th-century American politicians
People from Piqua, Ohio
United States Indian agents
1861 deaths
Kenyon College people
Miami University trustees
American people of the War of 1812
American people of the Northwest Indian War